Naveen Kumar Gowda (born 8 January 1986), better known by his stage name Yash, is an Indian actor who works in Kannada films. He is the recipient of three Filmfare Awards South.

Yash began his career with appearances in several television series in the 2000s. He made his film debut in 2007 with Jambada Hudugi. The 2008 romantic drama Moggina Manasu, for which he received the Filmfare Award for Best Supporting Actor, proved to be a breakthrough for Yash. His first film in a leading role, Rocky (2008), was poorly received critically and a box office flop. He followed it up with a series of romance films that were commercial successes, and received his first Filmfare Award for Best Actor nomination for Drama in 2012.

Yash went on to establish himself as a leading actor of Kannada cinema with the college romance Googly (2013), comedy-drama Raja Huli (2013), fantasy action Gajakesari (2014), romantic comedy Mr. and Mrs. Ramachari (2014), action film Masterpiece (2015) and action romance Santhu Straight Forward (2016). Mr. and Mrs. Ramachari ranks among the highest-grossing Kannada releases and gave Yash his first Filmfare Award for Best Actor. The pan-India success of Prashanth Neel's 2018 period action film K.G.F: Chapter 1, which became the highest-grossing Kannada film, helped Yash attain nationwide recognition in India and win his second Filmfare Award for Best Actor. He won further praise for his performance in the sequel, K.G.F: Chapter 2 (2022), which ranks as the fourth highest-grossing Indian film.

Yash promotes various social and philanthropic causes through the YashoMarga Foundation. He is married to the actress Radhika Pandit.

Early life and television roles 
Yash was born on 8 January 1986 in Boovanahalli, a village in Hassan, Karnataka. He was given two names: Naveen legally, and his mother's side of the family named him Yashwanth. Yashwanth was chosen as they believed his time of birth astrologically necessitated a name beginning with the letter ಯ (ya). In keeping with a Hindu tradition of giving children a deity's epithet, Yash was described as Nanjundeshwara ("poison-drinker god", referring to Shiva). Before starting his acting career, he was advised by others in the industry to adopt a stage name. Desiring to stand out with a name that was unique for an actor in Karnataka, he shortened Yashwanth to Yash.

Yash's father, Arun Kumar Gowda, was a driver for the Karnataka State Road Transport Corporation and later the Bangalore Metropolitan Transport Corporation. His mother, Pushpa, is a homemaker. He has a younger sister, Nandini, who is married to a computer engineer. Yash aspired to be an actor from a young age and actively participated in theatre and dance competitions at his school in Mysore. When he was young, his family also ran a provision store, where he would help out regularly. Yash wanted to quit school and pursue full-time acting after completing grade 10 but had to complete senior school on the demand of his parents. He studied at the Mahajana Education Society for all his school years. His parents initially disapproved of his acting ambitions, and his father wanted him to be a government officer. In 2003, they relented and allowed him to move to Bangalore at the age of 16 to work on a film as an assistant director, but stated that he would not be allowed to go back if he returned. The project was cancelled after only two days of filming, but Yash decided to stay back in Bangalore. He has stated he had  with him at the time. He joined a theatre group, the Benaka drama troupe, which was formed by dramatist B. V. Karanth.

Yash eventually became a backup actor, and in 2004, portrayed Balarama in the lead role for a play. While still working in theatre, he completed his Bachelor of Arts at Bangalore's K.L.E. College, with psychology and journalism among optional subjects. He made his television debut the same year with the teleserial Uttarayana. In 2005, he was offered a role in the teleserial Nanda Gokula, where he starred alongside Radhika Pandit. He went on to appear in several other teleserials such as T. N. Seetharam's Male Billu and Preeti Illada Mele. Once Yash had secured a stable income, his parents moved in with him to Bangalore. During this time, he was offered roles in seven films, but his insistence on having the script for each film made available to him was viewed as "arrogance from a newcomer" and often refused.

Career

Film debut and breakthrough (2008–2012) 

Yash debuted in 2007 with a supporting role in Priya Hassan's Jambada Hudugi, which saw him play a man whose infertile wife seeks uterus transplantation. He next played the romantic interest of his Nanda Gokula co-actor Radhika Pandit's character in the teen drama Moggina Manasu (2008), directed by Shashank, which follows the love lives of four girls who become friends in college. He was cast in a last-minute decision after Shashank's initial choice for the role fractured their leg and required rest for six months. Shashank then happened to see Yash in an episode of Preeti Illada Mele and was impressed by his performance. Yash was sporting a beard for Preeti Illada Mele but Shashank reached out to him and convinced him to shave clean for the role. R.G. Vijayasarathy of Rediff.com found the film to work despite its screenplay and highlighted Yash's performance among the male cast as impressive. The role won him the Filmfare Award for Best Supporting Actor in Kannada at the 56th Filmfare Awards South. The film is considered to be Yash's breakthrough project. 

Yash then starred in the title role in the romance Rocky (2008) opposite Bianca Desai, playing a college student who has a troubled relationship with his parents. Rocky emerged to be a critical and commercial failure; Vijayasarathy, who found him promising in Jambada Hudugi and Moggina Manasu, wrote that "he looks uncomfortable here, as the role lacks clarity." In the first of his two releases in 2009, the Sumana Kittur-directed action drama Kallara Santhe, he played Somu, a post-graduate student and later auto rickshaw driver who is driven to consider suicide by events in his life. To promote the film, he drove the winners of a local contest around Bangalore in an auto rickshaw, an event that attracted media attention. Writing for The New Indian Express, a critic was not impressed with the screenplay and wrote, "Though this film showcases contemporary issues such as extra-marital affairs, corruption and nepotism among politicians, the director has not succeeded in presenting them very well." The second release, Prakash's family drama Gokula, featured an ensemble cast including Vijay Raghavendra and Pooja Gandhi; A critic for The Times of India found the film to be restricted to only "those who love sentimental stories celebrating the bond between mothers and sons," but appreciated all the starring performances, including Yash. Both Kallara Santhe and Gokula failed to do well commercially. 

In 2010, Yash starred in the romantic comedy Modalasala, alongside Bhama. Sunayana Suresh of Daily News and Analysis felt the film had "its funny moments and occasionally, an overdose of sentimental scenes" and highlighted Yash's prowess as a dancer, calling him "easily one of the best we have in Sandalwood." The film was a commercial success, becoming Yash's first solo box office hit. His next release was the crime action Rajadhani (2011), about a group of friends who commit a murder for money and go on the run from a cop played by Prakash Raj. The film failed to meet both critical and commercial expectations, with Shruti Indira Lakshminarayana of Rediff.com feeling that its promising messages were lost in consumerism, but found Yash to be the best performer among the cast, writing, "He puts up a restrained performance and gets to play more than a motor-mouth lover boy." The same year, he appeared in Kirataka, a remake of the Tamil-language romantic comedy Kalavani (2010), playing a wayward student who falls in love with his batchmate, played by Oviya. It was the 3000th film to be released from the Kannada-language film industry. Lakshminarayana was appreciative of the film and wrote, "Yash is easily Kannada industry's best brat. The film gives him scope to exhibit his dance moves and at the same time brings out his acting talent." With earnings of 30 million domestically, Kirataka was one of the top-grossing Kannada films of 2011.

Yash had three film releases in 2012. The romantic comedy Lucky saw him play Lucky, an aspiring commercial director who gets an unrecognisable makeover and changes his name to Vicky. Vicky tried to woo Gowri (played by Ramya), a radio jockey, but finds that she loves Lucky. Srikanth Srinivasa of Rediff.com commended the "relaxing, feel-good movie," writing, "Yash looks dashing in the second half as the well-behaved Vicky but he is also equally at ease in his earlier avatar as Lucky." In contrast, a critic for the Indo-Asian News Service felt it was dragged down by being "predictable, inconsistent and illogical" and stated Yash "scores well as a dancer," but disliked his chemistry with Ramya. The action romance Jaanu, directed by Preetham Gubbi, followed a hotel owner who must overcome familial pressure to unite with his lover. A critic for the Indo-Asian News Service stated the film was "good for a one-time watch" and appreciated the fight sequences involving Yash. Both Lucky and Jaanu were fairly successful commercially. His final release of the year was Yograj Bhat's romantic comedy Drama, starring opposite Radhika Pandit. Shruti I.L. of Daily News and Analysis found the pair to be "a cute on screen couple" and felt they "liven[ed] up the screen with their effortless performances." It was one of the highest-grossing Kannada films of 2012.

Further success and stardom (2013–2017) 
Yash first appeared on-screen in 2013 in the Kannada-Tamil bilingual Chandra, with a cameo appearance in the song "Tasse Otthu" (Kannada)/"Raaja Raajan" (Tamil). He then starred in Googly, a college romance directed by Pavan Wadeyar, playing Sharath, a misogynist university student who dates Swathi (played by Kriti Kharbanda), but breaks up with her after being convinced that she is cheating on him. Years later, he becomes a successful businessman and encounters her. Intent on moving away from village-centric roles as in Kirataka and Drama, Yash saw Googly as a means to reinvent himself and adopted a different hairstyle for a "young and charming look". The film performed well and was one of the year's highest-grossing Kannada films. The Times of India noted that the success of Googly contributed to Yash's increasing stardom and put him on the path to becoming one of the leading stars of the industry. A critic writing for the newspaper found that Wadeyar "infused life into the story with excellent making" and granted "full marks" to Yash, highlighting his performance in the "sentimental sequences". Googly was followed by a series of hero-centric films whose primary selling point was Yash's screen presence, establishing him as a "mass hero". His final release of the year was Guru Deshpande's comedy-drama Raja Huli, a remake of the Tamil-language Sundarapandian (2012), which emerged to be a commercial success. Shyam Prasad S. of Bangalore Mirror called the film "a perfect blend of entertainment and drama" and noted, "Despite a hero-glorifying title, the film is not an action adventure."

In 2014, he starred in Gajakesari, which was directed by Krishna, and became commercially successful at the box office. A critic for Sify found it to carry "a neatly sketched story and a well executed script with good visuals" and appreciated his performance, suggesting that "nobody could have done this better than him." 

His next film Mr. and Mrs. Ramachari opposite Radhika Pandit had its theatrical release on 25 December 2014, and opened to positive reviews and collected an estimated 50 crore, and went on to become one of the highest grossing Kannada cinema. 

In 2015, he acted in Masterpiece, which emerged as a commercial hit at the box office. Archana Nathan of The Hindu disliked the film for its contrived parallel of the main character with Bhagat Singh and wrote of Yash, "His dialogue delivery is high-pitched and monotonous as is his acting." In 2016, he starred in Santhu Straight Forward which performed fairly well at the box office by collecting ₹30 crore.

K.G.F and wide recognition (2018–present) 
In 2018, Yash starred in the first instalment of the two-part Prashanth Neel-directed K.G.F series, K.G.F: Chapter 1, which was released in Kannada along with dubbed versions in Hindi, Telugu, Tamil, and Malayalam. Produced on a budget of 80crore, it was the most-expensive Kannada film at the time, and emerged as the highest-grossing Kannada film during its theatrical run. Yash grew out his beard for the role. K.G.F: Chapter 1 emerged to be a pan-Indian film, earning him nationwide recognition. The sequel, K.G.F: Chapter 2 (2022), which also starred Sanjay Dutt and Raveena Tandon, became the third highest-grossing Indian film ever with earnings over 10 billion. His performance in the series as Rocky, an assassin and gold kingpin who takes over the Kolar Gold Fields, received praise. A critic writing for the Hindustan Times opined he was "just unmissable." Sukanya Verma of Rediff.com was critical of the film but felt that Yash's "sly humour and unbridled ferocity hits all the right notes."

Personal life and off-screen work 
Yash met Radhika Pandit on the sets of Nanda Gokula in 2007. They became close friends after working together in films and eventually began dating, but kept their relationship private for years. Media speculation regarding the nature of their relationship intensified after Mr. and Mrs. Ramachari, their third film working together. They were engaged in Goa on 12 August 2016 at a private event with close friends and family. After week-long rituals leading up to the wedding day, they married on 9 December 2016 in Bangalore in a ceremony that saw prominent celebrities and politicians from Karnataka attending. Two separate wedding receptions were organised: one for friends and family, and another for fans at Bangalore Palace, for which attendance was open to every person in Karnataka. They have a daughter, Ayra (born December 2018), and a son, Yatharv Yash (born October 2019).

In 2017, Yash, along with Pandit, founded the YashoMarga Foundation, a social welfare non-profit organisation. In their first mission, the foundation addressed a water crisis in Karnataka's Koppal district by investing 40 million towards desilting lakes and providing pure drinking water to 40 villages in the region. That year, he sought protection from the police owing to death threats. Yash has campaigned for S. R. Mahesh of Janata Dal (Secular) in Krishnarajanagara and S. A. Ramdas of Bharatiya Janata Party in Krishnaraja constituency in the 2018 Karnataka Legislative Assembly elections. In 2019, he endorsed independent candidate Sumalatha, wife of Ambareesh, in Mandya constituency. He has stated that he is open to entering politics if the situation arises. Yash has collaborated with the Bangalore Police for a campaign against drunk driving in 2019, in the days leading up to New Year's Day. 50 days before his 34th birthday, his fans organised an environmental campaign to plant trees and save water. In 2021, he donated 5000 each to 3000 workers in the Kannada film fraternity to ease their financial burden after the COVID-19 pandemic.

In the media 

After the release of Moggina Manasu in 2009, Yash was considered a "wonder boy" in the media for his appearance, mannerisms and "ability to dance to any tune." Later films would see him play characters falling into the "mass hero" trope. He is sometimes credited as "Rocking Star Yash", a name that is stated to have originated among his fans for his image of "a rugged idol who follows no rules but his own." Another news outlet attributed the nickname to the "rocking" back-to-back commercial success of his films.

Yash acquired pan-Indian stardom following the success of the K.G.F films, and is cited in the media among the few South Indian actors with an audience in North India. He has stated that while his success in the Kannada industry felt gradual and over the years, the later nationwide recognition was an "overnight" phenomenon. Writing for India Today in 2022, Janani K. called him the "poster boy of Kannada cinema" for being the most recognisable person working in that industry across India. In 2019, he became the first Kannada actor to be featured on the cover of Forbes India. Forbes India further ranked him third on their list of most influential celebrities on Instagram from South India in October 2021. Yash debuted on The Times of Indias Bangalore Times Most Desirable Men list in 2012 at 11th place. He has since appeared on the list several times, and was ranked first in 2013, 2017 and 2020. In 2019, he was included by GQ India in their list of 50 most influential young Indians.

Yash has been described in sources as the highest-paid actor in the Kannada film industry, and one of the highest in South Indian cinema in general. In addition to being an active celebrity endorser for several brands (including Nestron, Celkon Mobiles and Ramraj Cotton), he partnered with Marico's grooming brand Beardo in 2020 to create a lifestyle label "Villain", which includes perfumes and clothing. He and his wife are joint ambassadors for Freedom Refined Sunflower Oil. Yash is a representative for Bengaluru Bulls in the Pro Kabaddi League.

Filmography

Films 
 All films are in Kannada unless otherwise indicated

Television

Music videos

Discography

Awards and nominations

Notes

References

External links 

 

Living people
1986 births
21st-century Indian male actors
Indian male film actors
Indian male television actors
Male actors in Kannada cinema
Kannada playback singers
Kannada male actors
Male actors from Mysore
Filmfare Awards South winners
South Indian International Movie Awards winners